Gottfredson is a surname. Notable people with the surname include:

Denise Gottfredson, American criminologist
Don Gottfredson (1926–2002), American criminologist
Floyd Gottfredson (1905–1986), American cartoonist best known for his defining work on the Mickey Mouse comic strip
Gary Gottfredson (born 1947), former professor of psychology at the University of Maryland, College Park
Linda Gottfredson (born 1947), professor of educational psychology at the University of Delaware
Michael R. Gottfredson (born 1951), the former President of the University of Oregon

See also 
Floyd Gottfredson Library, a series of books collecting the first 25 years of the 45-year span of work by Floyd Gottfredson on the daily Mickey Mouse comic strip